Nitrite reductase refers to any of several classes of enzymes that catalyze the reduction of nitrite.

Nitrite reductase may also refer to:

 Nitrite reductase (NO-forming)
 Nitrite reductase (NAD(P)H)

See also
 Cytochrome c nitrite reductase
 Ferredoxin—nitrite reductase
 Nitrate reductase (disambiguation)

 Biology disambiguation pages